Andrea Mira (born 17 January 1995 in Italy) is an Italian footballer.

References

Italian footballers
Living people
1995 births
Association football midfielders
A.C. Renate players